The Nearchi were an ancient tribe dwelling in lower Provence.

Name 
They are mentioned as Nearchi by Rufus Festus Avienus (4th c. CE).

The ethnonym can be compared with the Ancient Greek personal name Néarkhos (Νέαρχος; Latin Nearchus). It may have originally referred to a local settlement founded in southern Gaul by a Greek explorer bearing this name, then applied to the nearby tribe.

History 
Historian Guy Barruol argues that the great age of the sources used by Avienus could make the Nearchi one of the earliest documented tribes of lower Provence along with the Salyes. According to scholar Michael Dietler, however, even though Avienus' Ora Maritima, which was composed in the fourth century CE, "is thought to have been derived from a periplus written by a Massalian sailor of the sixth or fourth century BCE", it "can hardly be used as evidence of the earlier presence of this name" since the text contains "many anachronisms and errors".

Geography 
From what can be inferred from Avienus' account, the Nearchi dwelled in lower Provence, near the Salyes and the Rhône river. Their territory was probably situated in the Crau region, between the Rhône delta and the Alpilles. According to Barruol, they were part of the Saluvian confederation. 

The name is most likely linked to Bergion, the eponymous local fortress of the mythical hero Bergion.

References

Bibliography

Further reading 

 

Gauls
Tribes of pre-Roman Gaul
Historical Celtic peoples